Skeidskar Gap is a narrow gap in the ridge along the southeast side of Skarskvervet Glacier, in the Humboldt Mountains of Queen Maud Land. Discovered and photographed by the German Antarctic Expedition, 1938–39. Mapped by Norway from air photos and surveys by Norwegian Antarctic Expedition, 1956–60, and named Skeidskar.

Mountain passes of Queen Maud Land
Humboldt Mountains (Antarctica)